Vladimir Kovačević may refer to:

 Vladimir Kovačević (military officer) (born 1961), Montenegrin Serb military officer charged with violation of the laws of war
 Vladica Kovačević (Vladimir Kovačević, 1940–2016), Serbian footballer
 Vladimir Kovačević (footballer, born 1992), Serbian footballer
 Vlatko Kovačević (Vladimir Kovačević, born 1942), Croatian and Yugoslavian chess grandmaster
 Vladimir Kovačević (Chetnik) (1871–1905)